

Miss Serbia 2006

Miss Serbia 2007

Miss Serbia 2008

Miss Serbia 2009

Miss Serbia 2010

Miss Serbia 2011

Miss Serbia 2012

Miss Serbia 2013

Miss Serbia 2014

Miss Serbia